The J-class blimps were non-rigid airships designed by the Navy Bureau of Aeronautics and Goodyear Tire & Rubber Company in the early 1920s for the US Navy.

Design and development
Designed in 1919, the J-type were to be improvements upon the D-type. Improvements included a smaller envelope (174,800 cu ft), more powerful engines, a new, simple boat style control car capable of water landings and a single ballonet to reduce weight as tried in the H-1. Two airships, designated J-1 and J-2, were ordered. J-1 first flew 31 August 1922 at Wingfoot Lake. The J-1 was operated at Hampton Roads until airship operations there were terminated in 1924. From May 1924 the J-1 served at Lakehurst, and was at that time the Navy's only active blimp. Due to the single ballonet, the J-1 proved difficult to handle. J-1 was retired in August 1924. J-2 was cancelled due to the failure of the single ballonet J-1, with the car being stored at the Naval Aircraft Factory.

J-3 was assembled from an Army TC type envelope and control car, modified to suit the Navy. Instrumentation came from the J-1. The J-3 first flew 12 October 1926. Lakehurst was the only naval air station which the J-3 served at. Its role was to train crews for the ZR-3 and ZRS-4 and 5. The J-3 was lost on April 4, 1933 during a forced landing while searching for survivors of the Navy rigid airship   with the loss of 2 out of  the blimp's crew of 7. Rescue was made by a United States Coast Guard and New York Police Department amphibians. J-4 utilized the J-2 control car, modified by enclosing it, and a TC-type envelope. It was test flown in November 1927. The J-4 served as a trainer at Lakehurst until it was sent to Sunnyvale in the summer of 1933. After the Army took over Sunnyvale, the J-4 was returned to Lakehurst in May 1935. The J-4 was stricken from the Navy registry in March 1940.
 
The J-class blimps were equipped with a control car that was suspended externally from the envelope. Two radial engines powered the blimp.

Operators

United States Army As TC Class Blimps
United States Navy

Specifications (J-3 and J-4)

See also

References

 

1920s United States patrol aircraft
Airships of the United States Navy
Goodyear aircraft